Abgarmak-e Olya (also Romanized as Ābgarmak-e Olyā; also known as Ābgarmak-e Bālā (Persian: آبگرمک بالا) and Āb Garmeh-ye Bar Āftāb) is a village in Pishkuh-e Zalaqi Rural District, Besharat District, Aligudarz County, Lorestan Province, Iran. At the 2006 census, its population was 26, in 6 families.

References 

Towns and villages in Aligudarz County